Gilpin County School District RE-1 is a public school district in Gilpin County, Colorado, United States.

Schools
Gilpin County School District RE-1 has one elementary school and one high school.

Elementary schools 
Gilpin County Elementary School

High schools
Gilpin County Undivided High School

References

External links

School districts in Colorado
Education in Gilpin County, Colorado